The 1983 LPGA Championship was the 29th LPGA Championship, played June 9–12 at Jack Nicklaus Golf Center at Kings Island in Mason, Ohio, a suburb northeast of Cincinnati.

Seven strokes back after the third round, Patty Sheehan shot a 66 (−6) to win the first of her six major titles, two strokes ahead of runner-up Sandra Haynie, the 54-hole

Past champions in the field

Source:

Final leaderboard
Sunday, June 12, 1983

Source:

References

External links
Golf Observer leaderboard
The Golf Center at Kings Island

Women's PGA Championship
Golf in Ohio
LPGA Championship
LPGA Championship
LPGA Championship
LPGA Championship
Women's sports in Ohio